The Toshakhana reference case (officially titled reference of disqualification of Imran Khan), or the Toshakhana case, was a landmark decision by the ECP that disqualified incumbent Ex-Prime Minister of Pakistan, Imran Khan from holding public office for 5 years.

The Toshakhana case was filed in the month of August 2022 against Imran Khan by the PDM politicians, for not sharing the details of Toshakhana gifts in annual assets submitted to ECP. Election Commission of Pakistan initiated the inquiry and announced its final verdict on 21 October 2022 as ECP disqualified Imran from holding public for short term period for making the offence involving dishonest behavior, fabricated information, and inaccurate declaration in the reference under Article 63(1)(p) and ordered to send this reference to the trial court to initiate criminal proceedings.

Background

Toshakhana history 
It is the department that works under the Cabinet Division's administrative supervision, established in 1974 and It keeps priceless presents offered to rulers, lawmakers, bureaucrats, military personnel and other officials by the heads of other states, governments, and international dignitaries. As stated by the law of Pakistan, gifts and other such expensive items they obtain, people to whom these rules apply must share with the Cabinet Division and submit their gifts and materials into Toshakhana.

Toshakhana case 
The Toshakhana reference case was filed in the month of August against Ex-Prime Minister of Pakistan, Imran Ahmed Khan Niazi by the politicians named Mohsin Shahnawaz Ranjha and others from the coalition government of Pakistan (2022), for not disclosing the information about the gifts given to Toshakhana and the supposed sales revenue that means he sold gifts directly in market without submitting in Toshakhana, Imran officially received from different head of states. Lawmakers from the ruling alliance, Pakistan Democratic Movement, the reference had been given to Raja Pervaiz Ashraf, the speaker of Pakistan's National Assembly, later he passed this reference to Sikander Sultan Raja, Chief Election Commissioner of Pakistan for further necessary action.

Toshakhana, PIC and Islamabad High Court 
Last year 2021, journalist based in Islamabad Rana Abrar Khalid submitted the application to Pakistan Information Commission (PIC) for sharing the gifts detail received by Imran according to the Right to Information Law. PIC had approved a request and ordered the Cabinet Division to provide the needed data to journalist Abrar about the presents obtained by the Prime Minister Imran Khan from different head of states. The cabinet division told Pakistan Information Commission that Abrar would get the necessary information in 10 working days or less, and it would also be posted on the official website.

After Pakistan Information Commission's order and commitment of cabinet division to PIC, Cabinet Division argued that the PIC ruling was unlawful and challenged it in Islamabad High Court (IHC), stating that it was unlawful to share the detail of Toshakhana gifts with anyone.  After many hearings in court, in April this year, IHC had instructed Arshad Kayani, the deputy attorney general, to see that the PIC's directive to make public the specifics of the presents given to the Imran Khan, a former prime minister by heads of state after he took office in August 2018 was carried out.

ECP findings 
Since taking office in 2018, Imran Khan has resisted disclosing information on the presents, claiming that doing so would jeopardies relations with other countries. This is despite the PIC ordering that it be done.

In his latest reply to ECP on 8 September, Imran had admitted to selling the four gifts he had received from different head of states as the prime minister. He claimed that the gifts he purchased from the Toshakhana for Rs21.56 million brought in roughly Rs58 million at sale. A Graff watch and some cufflinks, a ring and an expensive pen were included in one of the gifts, while four Rolex watches were included in the other three.

In the Toshakhana reference case, lawmakers from the ruling coalition of Pakistan (PDM) presented documentary evidence to support their allegations against the former prime minister Imran and demanded his disqualification in accordance with article 63 of the Pakistani Constitution, sections 2 and 3, accompanied by Article 62(1)(f).

Final verdict 
Following the ECP findings, Imran's admission and petitioner's documentary evidence Election of Pakistan had saved the decision against the Toshakhana reference on 2 October 2022. On 21 October ECP announced their saved decision to 5 year disqualification of ex-prime minister of Pakistan Imran Khan for making it a crime to engage in unethical behavior, make false assertions, and make erroneous declarations in the reference under Article 63(1)(p) and ordered to send this reference to the trial court to initiate criminal proceedings.

Aftermath 
Following the ECP verdict, Imran Khan was disqualified from any public office holding. After the ECP verdict Imran challenged the decision in Islamabad High Court on 22 October 2022.

Trial in  sessions court 
As per verdict, on November 21, 2022, the Election Commission of Pakistan (ECP) sent the trial court a reference regarding the Toshakhana (gift depository) to begin criminal proceedings against former prime minister and PTI Chairman Imran Khan. In accordance with Sections 137, 170, and 167 of the Election Act, the district and sessions judge had received the reference. The written decision stated that the PTI chief had "intentionally and deliberately" broken the laws outlined in sections 137, 167, and 173 of the Elections Act, 2017 by providing a "false statement" and "incorrect declaration" to the ECP in the details of his assets and liabilities filed by him for the calendar year 2020–21.

Imran was found to have engaged in "corrupt acts," as described in Sections 167 and 173 of the Elections Act of 2017, which is criminal under Section 174 of the same law, by making false statements and erroneous declarations. In accordance with Section 190(2) of the Elections Act, the commission had ordered the ex-premier to face criminal charges for making a false declaration.

On December 27, 2022, The IHC instructed the Cabinet Division to report the specifics of gifts obtained from Toshakhana since 1947. Khawaja Haris was hired by PTI as a lawyer for the Toshakhana case. He had extensive experience in handling complex legal matters, including his previous role as Advocate General in the PML-N government and his involvement in various high-profile cases such as the Signal-Free Corridor project and the Orange Line Train projects. During the Panamagate case, Haris was part of the legal team for Nawaz Sharif and challenged the verdict in the Islamabad High Court.

References 

2022 in Pakistani politics
Corruption in Pakistan
Nawaz Sharif administration
Pakistan Tehreek-e-Insaf
Election Commission of Pakistan